Creger is a surname. Notable people with the surname include:

Bernie Creger (1927–1997), American baseball player
Rosa Charlyne Creger (1918–2005), American pilot and nurse
William P. Creger (1922–2013), American hematologist

See also
Cruger (surname)